Deccan Park is the single largest Global Development Center (GDC) commissioned in Hyderabad, Telangana, India. The facility is designed by Swiss architect, Mario Botta.

The facility
The Deccan Park has been set up with an estimated investment of Rs 1.50 billion with recreation and sporting facilities, which will house 2,200 professionals. The GDC will be the centre of excellence in domain areas such as telecom, e-governance, biological sciences, ports and shipping and also deploy cutting-edge technologies including .Net, open source billing and bioinformatics.

Inauguration
The Deccan Park was inaugurated by Pascal Couchepin, President of Swiss Confederation, in the presence of N. Chandrababu Naidu, Chief Minister of State, Arun Shourie, Minister for Divestment and IT and Communications, and IT, Ratan Tata, Chairman of Tata Sons.

References

External links
 Description of the development
 Google Maps Address Search Link

Articles lacking sources from February 2008
Buildings and structures in Hyderabad, India
Mario Botta buildings
Office buildings in India